Rogozikha is a rural locality (a selo) and the administrative center of Rogozikhinsky Selsoviet, Pavlovsky District, Altai Krai, Russia. The population was 915 as of 2013. There are 15 streets.

Geography 
Rogozikha is located 18 km southwest of Pavlovsk (the district's administrative centre) by road. Buranovka is the nearest rural locality.

References 

Rural localities in Pavlovsky District, Altai Krai